John William Lane (29 May 1898 – June 1984) was an English professional footballer who played as an inside right. He is best remembered for his five years in the Football League with Brentford, for whom he made 234 appearances and was club captain. He was posthumously inducted into the Brentford Hall of Fame in 2015.

Club career

Burnley 
An inside forward, Lane began his career at hometown non-League club Cradley Heath. He secured a move to the top flight of English football with Burnley in December 1920 and made his professional debut during the club's Championship-winning 1920–21 season. He failed to make an impression at Turf Moor and departed in 1923, having made just five league appearances for the Clarets.

Chesterfield 
Lane dropped down to the Third Division North to sign for Chesterfield in 1923, in part-exchange for Philip Pedlar. The Spireites pushed hard for promotion during his time with the club and he departed in March 1925. Lane made 70 appearances and scored 19 goals during his time at Saltergate.

Brentford 
Lane transferred to Third Division South strugglers Brentford in March 1925. He got off to a good start at Griffin Park, scoring on his debut versus Swansea Town and scoring a further three goals in his final eight appearances of the season. He established himself as a first team regular in the following season, making 40 appearances and scoring 9 goals. The arrival of Harry Curtis as manager in 1926 saw Lane appointed as captain and was he was an automatic pick when fit. His final two seasons were his best at Griffin Park, when he scored 19 goals in each of the 1929–30 and 1930–31 seasons. As a recognition of his service to the club, Lane was awarded the proceeds from a London Combination match versus Southampton in 1930. He departed Brentford in January 1931 and at the time was the club's record Football League goalscorer, having amassed 234 appearances and 86 goals during just under six years at Griffin Park. Lane was posthumously inducted into the Brentford Hall of Fame in 2015.

Crystal Palace 
Lane transferred to Third Division South club Crystal Palace on 29 January 1931. As with his time at Brentford, he narrowly missed out on promotion from the division and left the club in September 1932, having scored 10 goals in 34 appearances.

Aldershot 
Lane transferred to Third Division South club Aldershot in September 1932. He played for one season at the Recreation Ground before retiring, having scored eight goals in 36 appearances.

Personal life 
After retiring from football in 1933, Lane was licensee of the Royal Horse Guardsmen pub in Ealing Road, Brentford until 1980. He lived in Brentford and died in 1984.

Career statistics

Honours 
 Brentford Hall of Fame

References 

1898 births
1984 deaths
English footballers
Association football inside forwards
Burnley F.C. players
Chesterfield F.C. players
Brentford F.C. players
Crystal Palace F.C. players
Aldershot F.C. players
English Football League players
Cradley Heath F.C. players
People from Cradley Heath